Albertino Eduardo Ferreira Ventura Pereira (born 23 January 1950 in Porto), simply Albertino, is a Portuguese retired footballer who played as a forward.

External links

1950 births
Living people
Footballers from Porto
Portuguese footballers
Association football forwards
Primeira Liga players
Leixões S.C. players
Boavista F.C. players
FC Porto players
C.S. Marítimo players
Portugal international footballers
Portuguese expatriate footballers
Expatriate footballers in Angola